The Piano Trio No. 1 in B major, Op. 21 (B. 51), is a piano trio by Antonín Dvořák, completed in 1875. It is the first out of the four surviving piano trios, preceded by two works from 1871 to 1872 that Dvořák destroyed (B. 25 and B. 26).

Structure 
The composition consists of four movements in the classical tradition:

A typical performance takes approximately 31 minutes.

History 
The piano trio was written in the spring of 1875; the autograph dates the completion date to 14 May 1875. The premiere was held on 17 February 1877 at a concert in Prague.

References

External links 
 
 , performed by Kyung Wha Chung, Myung-Wha Chung and Myung-Whun Chung

1875 compositions
Compositions in B-flat major
Piano trios by Antonín Dvořák